Vílanec is a municipality and village in Jihlava District in the Vysočina Region of the Czech Republic. It has about 300 inhabitants.

Administrative parts
The village of Loučky is an administrative part of Vílanec.

References

Villages in Jihlava District